Anne Sulling (born 12 October 1976 in Tartu) is an Estonian politician and a member of Riigikogu. She represents the Tartu constituency as a member of the Estonian Reform Party.

Between 2005 and 2006, Sullin worked for the Ministry of Finance on the Estonia’s euro changeover project. Between 2009 and 2014, Sulling was an adviser to the Prime Minister Andrus Ansip in matters related to macro-economics, the euro and the  quota trade. She was named the “Person of the Year” by Postimees in 2011, for her work concerning  quota sales.

In March 2014, Sulling was named Minister of Foreign Trade and Entrepreneurship in Taavi Rõivas' first cabinet. In the 2015 parliamentary election, Sulling was elected to Riigikogu with 4,197 votes.

References

1976 births
Living people
Government ministers of Estonia
Politicians from Tartu
Estonian Reform Party politicians
Members of the Riigikogu, 2015–2019
Female foreign ministers
Women members of the Riigikogu
Women government ministers of Estonia
Estonian women diplomats
Recipients of the Order of the White Star, 4th Class
21st-century Estonian politicians
21st-century Estonian women politicians